Miroslav Kollár (born 13 August 1969) is a Slovak politician. He Kollár has served as a Member of the National Council since 2020. From September 2021 he has served as the chairman and sole MP of the Together – Civic Democracy party. Between 2014 and 2022 he served as the Mayor of Hlohovec.

Early life 
Kollár was born and raised in Hlohovec. He studied commerce at the University of Economics in Bratislava, graduating in 1991. After graduation, he worked as a journalist and was involved in a local politics in Hlohovec.

Political career 
In 2019 Kollár joined the new party of president Andrej Kiska For the People. In the V 2020 Slovak parliamentary election, he gained a seat.

He became the only government MP who refused to personally sign the coalition agreement. Even though he supported the government at the time, he felt the signature would limit his freedom to vote according to his personal conscience.

After the retirement of Andrej Kiska, Kollár unsuccessfully ran for the post of For the People chairman against Veronika Remišová.

In February 2021 he officially left the government as well as the For the People party. In April, he joined the Together – Civic Democracy party, which narrowly failed to pass the representation threshold in 2020, becoming its sole MP. Soon after, he became the Chairman of Together, having defeated the previous Chairman Juraj Hipš in a leadership contest.

References

1969 births
Living people
For the People (Slovakia) politicians
People from Hlohovec
University of Economics in Bratislava alumni
Members of the National Council (Slovakia) 2020-present